Colin Crooks LVO is a British diplomat serving as the British Ambassador to the Republic of Korea since 2022.

Previously he served as  British Ambassador to the Democratic People's Republic of Korea from December 2018 to December 2021.

Prior to serving as the Ambassador to the DPRK, Crooks served in various other positions in Her Majesty's Diplomatic Service, and was the Minister Counsellor at the British Embassy Beijing from 2015 to 2018 and the Chargé d'Affairs to the British Embassy in Pyongyang in 2008.

In May 2020, Crooks announced via Twitter that the Pyongyang embassy had been evacuated as a result of the COVID-19 pandemic.

Sources

 

Living people
Ambassadors of the United Kingdom to North Korea
Ambassadors of the United Kingdom to South Korea
Year of birth missing (living people)
British diplomats in China